Enrico Cini, O.F.M. Conv. or Enrico Siculus (died 1598) was a Roman Catholic prelate who served as Bishop of Alife (1586–1598).

Biography
Enrico Cini was ordained a priest in the Order of Friars Minor Conventual. 
On 8 January 1586, he was appointed during the papacy of Pope Sixtus V as Bishop of Alife. 
On 19 January 1586, he was consecrated bishop by Giulio Antonio Santorio, Cardinal-Priest of San Bartolomeo all'Isola, with Prospero Rebiba, Titular Patriarch of Constantinople, and Raffaele Bonelli, Archbishop of Dubrovnik serving as co-consecrators. 
He served as Bishop of Alife until his death in 1598.

See also 
Catholic Church in Italy

References

External links and additional sources
 (for Chronology of Bishops) 
 (for Chronology of Bishops) 

16th-century Italian Roman Catholic bishops
Bishops appointed by Pope Sixtus V
1598 deaths
Conventual Franciscan bishops